Governor Clements may refer to:

Bill Clements (1917–2011), 42nd & 44th Governor of Texas
Earle Clements (1896–1985), 47th Governor of Kentucky

See also
Orion Clemens (1825–1897), Acting Governor of Nevada Territory
Governor Clement (disambiguation)